Paukjärv is a lake in Estonia.

See also
List of lakes of Estonia

Lakes of Estonia
Kuusalu Parish
Lakes of Harju County